is a passenger railway station in located in the city of  Hikone,  Shiga Prefecture, Japan, operated by the private railway operator Ohmi Railway. The station was named after Dainippon Screen Mfg. Co., Ltd., whose Hikone office the station serves.

Lines
Screen Station is a station of the Ohmi Railway Taga Line, and is located 0.8 rail kilometers from the opposing terminus of the line at Takamiya Station.

Station layout
The station consists of a single platform serving one track.. The station is unattended.

Adjacent stations

History
Construction started on 5 December 2007, and the station opened on 15 March 2008.

Passenger statistics
In fiscal 2019, the station was used by an average of 634 passengers daily (boarding passengers only).

Surrounding area
Dainippon Screen Mfg. Co., Ltd., Hikone office
Bridgestone Hikone factory

See also
List of railway stations in Japan

References

External links

 Ohmi Railway official site 

Railway stations in Japan opened in 2008
Railway stations in Shiga Prefecture
Hikone, Shiga